Christopher Timothy Rearick (born December 5, 1987) is an American former professional baseball pitcher. He played in Major League Baseball (MLB) for the San Diego Padres in 2015.

Career

Tampa Bay Rays
Rearick was drafted by the Tampa Bay Rays in the 41st round of the 2010 Major League Baseball Draft out of North Georgia College & State University.

San Diego Padres
He was traded to the San Diego Padres for Vince Belnome in December 2012.  Rearick was called up to the majors for the first time on April 10, 2015.

Texas Rangers
Rearick was claimed off waivers by the Texas Rangers on August 26, 2015. He was re-claimed by the Padres on August 30. He was released in March 2016.

Sugar Land Skeeters
On April 18, 2016, Rearick signed with the Sugar Land Skeeters of the Atlantic League of Professional Baseball. He was released by the Skeeters.

Bridgeport Bluefish
Rearick signed with the Bridgeport Bluefish of the Atlantic League of Professional Baseball to finish out the 2016 season. After starting the season with the Skeeters as a reliever, he converted to a starter with Bridgeport. Rearick resigned with the Bridgeport Bluefish for the 2017 season.

Los Angeles Dodgers
On June 18, 2017, Rearick signed a minor league deal with the Los Angeles Dodgers. He was released on August 10. On November 1, 2017, Rearick was drafted by the Lancaster Barnstormers in the Bridgeport Bluefish dispersal draft.

References

External links

1987 births
Living people
People from Chatham County, Georgia
Baseball players from Georgia (U.S. state)
Major League Baseball pitchers
San Diego Padres players
Princeton Rays players
Liga de Béisbol Profesional Roberto Clemente pitchers
Bowling Green Hot Rods players
Charlotte Stone Crabs players
Montgomery Biscuits players
Phoenix Desert Dogs players
San Antonio Missions players
Sugar Land Skeeters players
El Paso Chihuahuas players
Bridgeport Bluefish players
Estrellas Orientales players
American expatriate baseball players in the Dominican Republic
Tiburones de Aguadilla players
Tulsa Drillers players
North Georgia Nighthawks baseball players